Akshaya Mohanty, also known as Khoka Bhai, was an Indian singer, lyricist, composer, musician and writer in Odia. He has contributed Odia bhajans, Odissi songs, folk songs, film and non-film modern light songs in Odisha on contemporary themes and ballads based on popular legends in Odisha.

Life history

Early life 
Mohanty was born to Bichitrananda Mohanty and Subarna Manjari Mohanty at Cuttack on 12 October 1936. Mohanty had no formal training in music. At the age of 22 in 1956, he joined Government services in his home city Cuttack, but quit after seven years in 1963. He became an approved lyricist in All India Radio, Cuttack in 1956. By 1959 he became an approved composer in All India Radio.

Family 
He was married to Prabina Mohanty in 1967. He has two sons and two daughters. His son Chitrabhanu Mohanty is a stage singer.

Career 
Akshaya recorded his first song Gadiala Bhai Dharichhi Sura Re in 50s. His first song as a playback singer was Gori Gori Gori in the 1959 Odia movie Maa. He has sung songs in 129 Odia films.

In 1965, he composed music for the movie Malajanha, directed by Odia filmmaker, Nitai Palit. A song from the movie Rakata Talamala went on to top the charts. He composed music for 75 movies. He has experimented with themes, words and in recording and producing special sound effects. Some of his experiments include starting a new cult of ballads in Odia, based on popular legends, such as Kanchi Abhijana, Randipua Ananta, and Konaraka Gatha. He also recorded a popular drama, Patent Medicine, that went on to win the best radio drama award from All India Radio. Some of his popular songs are 'Kene Gheni Jauchha Jagannathanku', 'Saata Daria Paare', 'He Phaguna Tume', 'Raja Jhia Sange', 'Rakata Tala Mala', 'Chakori Jhara'anaa Luha'. Akshaya Mohanty also has acted in 3 movies e.

As a music composer 
He composed music in 75 films.

 Mala Janha
 Kie Kahar
 Sansar
 Jajabara
 Naga Phasa
 Taapoi
 Jhili Mili
 Nijhum Ratira Sathi
 Shree Jagannath
 Kie Jite Kie Hare
 Ashanta Graha
 Mahasati Sabitree
 Swapna Sagar
 Danda Balunga
 Jai Phula
 Jaga Hatare Pagha
 Sankha Sindura
 Mamata Mage Moola
 Nala Damayanti
 Baje Bainshi Nache Ghungura
 Chaka Bhaunree
 Sabu Mayare Baya
 Eai Aama Sanshara
 Karunamaya
 Badhu Nirupama
 Eai Ta Duniya
 Tunda Baida
 Jor Jar Mulak Taar
 Thilli Jhia Heli Bohu
 Suna Chadhei
 Kurukshetra
 Papa Punya
 Pua Mora Kala Thakura
 Mamata Ra Dori
 Chaka Akhi Sabu Dekhuchi
 Bidhira Bidhana
 Aasuchi Mo Kalia Suna
 Daiba Daudi
 Chaka Dola Karuchi Lila
 Thakura Achhanti Choubahaku
 Paradesi Chadhei
 Kalia Bharasa
 Ama Ghara Ama Sansar
 Hasa Luha Bhara Dunia
 To Binu Anya Gati Nahin
 Kotie Manisha Gotie Jaga
 Kapala Likhana
 Bhisma Pratigyan
 Suna Bhauja
 Rakhile Siba Mariba Kie
 Lakhsmana Rekha
 Pua Mora Jagatajita
 Jai Jagannatha

Albums

Ahuti (Original Motion Picture Soundtrack)
All Time Greats Akshaya Mohanty
Oriya Songs Akshaya Mohanty
Ago Moro Phularani
Songs From The Land Of Jagannath
Jajabara
Mo Pati Mo Debata
Modern Oriya Songs - Akshyaya Mohanty
Uttam Uttam (Remix)
Modern Oriya Songs - Akshaya Mohanty
Nyay Chakara - Kartabya
Kapaala Likhana
Pathara Khashila Bada Deularu
Jai Jagannatha
Danda Balunga
Oriya Songs - Akshay Mohanty
Sankhamandala
Pardesi Chadhei - Jaa Debi Sarba Bhutedhu
Jaga Hatare Pagha
Mukti Tirtha
Oriya Modern Songs - Akshay Mohanty
Oriya Modern Songs
Oriya Songs : Akshyaya Mohanty
Maa Mati Mamata
Devotional Songs By Akshaya Mohanty
Jajabara Ory
Paap Punya
Kali Gori
Suna Chadhei
Oriya Devotional Songs - Akshaya Mohanty

Popular songs 
Light/Romantic

 Gadiala Bhai Dharichhi Sura Re
 Smruti Tume
 Bayasara Krushnachuda
 Tahun Kanji Gala
 Udi Udi Udi Ja Re Udi
 Ja Ja Re Bhasi Bhasi Ja
 Raja Jhia Sange
 Ba Ba Re Capital
 Punyara Nadi Tire
 Abujha Priyatama
 Nadira Nama Alasakanya
 Sabi Sabi Tu To Mora
 Alo Ratani
 He Faguna Tume Gala Pare Pare
 Nanda Mundia Driver
 Sakalara Gadi
 Bandhu Re Anide Anide Mote
 Baby Eka Gelha Jhia
 Gori Gori Gori
 Rakata Talamala
 Tik Tik Tik Ghanta Chale
 Ei Chumki (Duet)
 Rangabati Re Rangabati
 Abujha Priayatama
 Phulei Rani Saja Phula
 Jajabara Mana Mora
 Chhapi Chhapi Basanto Rati
 Rail Gadi Jauchhi Gadi
 Sata Daria Pari Re
 Chandrama Eka Chandana Bindu
 Chandramailli Hase
 Ae E E Alo Alo Mani
 Rati Je Khoje
 Ei rum Juhum Jhum Jhum Nupura
 Kalankita Ei Nayaka
 Hasa Ta Lakhye Tanka
 Sabi Sabi Tu Ta Mora
 Udigale Gendalia Jhadi Dela Para
 Boula Hebi Nahin
 Tu Ki Buli Baharilu Sahara
 Mathia Re Gote Kana
 Kali Gori Dihen Gadhei
 Thik Tori Pari Jhia Tie
 Jataka Padichhi

Bhajans (Devotional)
 Eka To Bhakata Jibana
 Kene Gheni Jauchha Jagannathanku
 Olata Brukhye Khelucchi
 Adhagadha Diankara
 Dasavatara (Gita Govinda)
 Srikrushnara Banshi Swana Suni
 Jaya Jaya Jagannatha
  Seta  Bhakat Bhabare Bandhare

Popular Ballads
 Kanchi Abhijana
 Randipua Ananta
 Konarak Gatha

Awards 
 Jayadeva Award: The highest state award in movies
 State Award for best playback singer seven times
 State Award for best composer twice
 Many Awards from Orissa Cinecritic Association

Writing 
 Aneswata Rani (Collection of short stories)
 Bichara (Collection of short stories)
 Nagna Monalisa (Collection of short stories)
 Ba Ba Re America (Travelogue)
 Aryadasara Atmalipi (Semi-autobiographical)
 Aryadasara Sheshalipi (Semi-autobiographical)
 Bamapanthi (Novel)
 Aphera Nadi (Novel)
 Gayaka (Novel)
 Jaya Nuhen Jaya (Novel)
 Gotie Kuhu, Aneka Uhu (Novel)

See also
 Sikandar Alam
 Prafulla Kar
 Bhikari Bal
 Aarti Mukherjee
 Sandhya Mukhopadhyay
 Vani Jairam
 S. Janaki

References

External links 
 
 
 Songs of Akshaya Mohanty
More Songs of Akshaya Mohanty

1936 births
2002 deaths
People from Kendrapara district
Indian male playback singers
Indian film score composers
Odia-language writers
20th-century Indian singers
Singers from Odisha
Indian male film score composers
20th-century Indian male singers